Colin Beattie (born 17 October 1951) is a Scottish National Party (SNP) politician. He has been the Member of the Scottish Parliament (MSP) for the Midlothian North and Musselburgh constituency since 2011. Prior to this role, he was a councillor and group leader of the SNP on Midlothian Council.

Early career
For 23 years, Beattie worked as an international banker across the Middle East and Asia. He then decided after a period of working in London that he would return to living in Scotland with his wife, Lisa.

Political career
Beattie took an early retirement in 2006 to focus on being elected to Midlothian Council. He was elected to represent Midlothian South in the 2007 Midlothian Council election and was SNP group leader on the Council.

Beattie won the newly created seat of Midlothian North and Musselburgh in the 2011 Scottish Parliament election with a majority of just under 3000 votes. He retained his seat in the 2016 Scottish Parliament election, with a majority of over 7,000 votes. He was also the SNP National Treasurer from 2004–2020; he was defeated in the 2020 SNP internal elections by Douglas Chapman. However when Chapman later resigned in May 2021, stating "I had not received the support or financial information required to carry out the fiduciary duties of National Treasurer", Beattie returned to the position.

He was selected unopposed as the SNP's candidate for the 2021 Scottish Parliament election and retained his seat, with an increased majority of 7,906.

Beattie was formally censured in 2013 by the Standards Commission for Scotland for breaching the Councillors’ code of Conduct for failing to register interest in property whilst a councillor.

Personal life
Beattie is married to former Midlothian Council leader Lisa Beattie.

References

External links 
 

1951 births
Living people
Scottish National Party MSPs
People from Forfar
Scottish bankers
Scottish National Party councillors
Members of the Scottish Parliament 2011–2016
Members of the Scottish Parliament 2016–2021
Members of the Scottish Parliament 2021–2026